Thoth Tarot is an esoteric tarot deck painted by Lady Frieda Harris according to instructions from Aleister Crowley.  Crowley referred to this deck as The Book of Thoth, and also wrote a 1944 book of that title intended for use with the deck.

Background
Crowley originally intended the Thoth deck to be a six-month project aimed at updating the traditional pictorial symbolism of the tarot. However, due to increased scope, the project eventually spanned five years, between 1938 and 1943.

Symbolism
The illustrations of the deck feature symbolism based upon Crowley's incorporation of imagery from many disparate disciplines, including science and philosophy and various occult systems (as described in detail in his The Book of Thoth).

Differences from Rider–Waite tarot

Order and names of trumps
Crowley renamed several of the trumps compared to earlier arrangements, and also re-arranged the numerical, astrological and Hebrew alphabet correspondences of 4 trumps compared to the Rider–Waite tarot deck in accordance with the Tarot of Marseilles, his 1904 book The Book of the Law (Liber AL vel Legis) and its "New Commentary." In the "New Commentary" and The Book of Thoth, Crowley demonstrates that his trump arrangement forms a double loop in the zodiac-number and letter-number correspondences compared to the Rider–Waite, where there is no loop. There are interpretations as to why the Thoth Tarot deck does not follow Crowley's new arrangement having only a letter-number double loop and one of them is that it follows the same Golden Dawn arrangement as the Rider–Waite deck.

Names of court cards
Crowley altered the names of all the court cards which can cause some confusion for people used to the more common decks. The typical corresponding names are as follows:

Minor Arcana

Wands

Cups

Swords

Disks

Conservation
Harris' renditions of the tarot are on watercolor paper affixed to a thick backing; the acidity of the backing, according to a report from 2006, resulted in discoloration of borders, and to some extent, the paintings themselves.  The paintings also required cleaning and the repair of small tears. A conservation plan called for the cleaning surfaces, the removal of backing (while retaining original inscriptions), reuse of the hand-painted window mats, and replacement of overlays with acid-free, museum-quality paper. The project was completed in 2011. The paintings are owned by the Warburg Institute; work was completed by the Institute's in-house specialist, Susan Campion.

References

Citations

Works cited

Further reading

 
 

Thelema
Works by Aleister Crowley
Divination Tarot decks